Going Straight is a BBC sitcom created and written by Dick Clement and Ian La Frenais, and starring Ronnie Barker and Richard Beckinsale. The programme was a direct spin-off to the sitcom Porridge, which all four were involved in, with its premise surrounding the exploits of Barker's character Norman Stanley Fletcher following his release from prison and his attempts to not commit another crime for the sake of his family, despite the allure that crime brings. The programme also featured the appearance of Patricia Brake, reprising her role in Porridge, and Nicholas Lyndhurst. Both Fulton Mackay and Tony Osoba guest starred in the first episode, also reprising their earlier roles.

A single series of six episodes was made and aired across 1978, attracting an audience of over 15 million viewers and winning a BAFTA award in March 1979. Plans for further episodes were shelved after the premature death of Beckinsale in 1979.

Episodes

Six episodes of Going Straight, all written by Dick Clement and Ian La Frenais, were produced for the BBC. The show began airing on 24 February and ended on 7 April 1978. All episodes had a running time of approximately 30 minutes.

Theme tune
The theme tune, sung by Ronnie Barker, detailed Fletch's determination to go straight, an ambition first laid out in the Porridge episode "Men Without Women": This was released as 7-inch single by EMI records. The B-side is a track called "The String Bean Queen'"

References

External links

1970s British sitcoms
1978 British television series debuts
1978 British television series endings
BBC television sitcoms
British television spin-offs
English-language television shows
Television shows set in London
Television series by BBC Studios